Chidi Osondu, professionally known as Chi Chi, is a Nigerian-American record producer and songwriter signed with Universal Music Publishing Group. He is a frequent collaborater with Atlanta rapper Lil Baby, having produced several songs for his studio albums My Turn and The Voice of the Heroes, as well as his single "On Me" which peaked at number 15 on the Billboard Hot 100. He has produced other hits such as BRS Kash's "Throat Baby (Go Baby)", which peaked at number 24 on the Billboard Hot 100, and Gucci Mane's "Both Sides", and has also worked with rappers Rylo Rodriguez, Yungeen Ace, and Caleb Colossus. His works are identified by his producer tag "What's happenin' Chi Chi?".

Early life
Born in Jonesboro, Georgia, Chi Chi was raised in a Nigerian household and was strongly influenced by Afrobeats music and blueprint styles created by producers such as Wheezy and Southside etc.

Career
Chi Chi made a name for himself throughout 2020 with his collaborations with artists such as Lil Baby on his triple platinum album My Turn, BRS Kash, Gucci Mane, and Rylo Rodriguez. It was described as a "groundbreaking" year for him by The Source.

Announced on April 8, 2021, Chi Chi signed an exclusive label deal with Universal Music Publishing Group, who believe he will become one of the industry's most sought-after producers. Not long after, he worked with Rylo Rodriguez on his single "Mo Money Mo Followers", and three songs in Lil Baby and Lil Durk's collaborative studio album The Voice of the Heroes, released on June 4.

Production discography

References

Living people
African-American record producers
American hip hop record producers
Southern hip hop musicians
Musicians from Atlanta
Year of birth missing (living people)
American people of Nigerian descent
21st-century African-American people